Piplan Tehsil, is an administrative subdivision (tehsil) of Mianwali District in the Punjab province of Pakistan. The tehsil is subdivided into 2 Municipal committees and 12 Union Councils - one of which forms the capital Liaqatabad. According to 6th Housing and Population Census-2017, total population of Piplan Tehsil is 403,938, out of which 307,729 lives in rural areas while 96,209 lives in urban areas.

Administration
The tehsil of Piplan is administratively subdivided into 2 Municipal Committees MC Piplan and MC Kundian. 
And also 12 Union Councils, these are:

 Alluwali
 Dabb Balouchan
 Doaba, Mianwali
 Kacha Gujrat
 Noshera Mor
 Hazara Shumali
 MamuWali
 Chak No 7 ML Hafiz Wala
 Hernoli (Urban)
 Harnoli (Rural)
 Khola Khanqah Sirajia
 Kundian Rural
 Chak No 4 DB
 Tibba Mehrban Shah
 Vichvin Bala
 Kundian

Kundian 
kundian Is Most populated city of Piplan

References

Mianwali District
Tehsils of Punjab, Pakistan